Derrick Harold Robins (27 June 1914 – 3 May 2004) was an English cricketer and sports promoter, at one time chairman of Coventry City Football Club. He was born in Bexleyheath, Kent.

Robins played two matches for Warwickshire in 1947, but did little and never played county cricket again. Extraordinarily, his third first-class appearance would come 22 years later, when he appeared for his own "D. H. Robins's XI" against the touring West Indians at The Saffrons, Eastbourne. Robins made two further appearances for his own XI, against Oxford University in 1969 and against the Indians in 1971, the latter game coming a few days after his 57th birthday.

However, he was better known as the promoter who took several strong sides to apartheid South Africa in the 1970s. Between 1972/73 and 1975/76 a D. H. Robins's XI played in the country each winter. In those days there were no sanctions against cricketers who visited South Africa, and Robins's teams included players of high quality, including such names as Bob Willis, Brian Close, Tony Greig and Trevor Chappell. Detailed accounts of these matches can be found in the International cricket in South Africa from 1971 to 1981 article.

He also took first-class teams to Sri Lanka in 1977–78 and New Zealand in 1979–80.

He died in South Africa at the age of 89.

References
Cricinfo profile
Wisden obituary

1914 births
English cricketers
Warwickshire cricketers
English football chairmen and investors
Coventry City F.C. directors and chairmen
2004 deaths
D. H. Robins' XI cricketers
20th-century English businesspeople